Changeable may refer to:

Changeables also known as McRobots, a toy series produced by McDonald's
Changeable hawk-eagle
Swift & Changeable
Changeable lizard, or Oriental garden lizard
Changeable tree toad, or gray tree frog
Changeable silk, clothes, or shot silk
Changeable grass-veneer, or Fissicrambus mutabiliz